Crossotus sublineatus is a species of beetle in the family Cerambycidae. It was described by Gestro in 1892. It is known from Chad, Algeria, Mauritania, Djibouti, Ethiopia, Somalia, Mali, Morocco, Kenya, Niger, Senegal, and Sudan.

References

sublineatus
Beetles described in 1892